Peel Sessions is an EP by the San Diego, California rock band Hot Snakes, released in 2005 by Swami Records. It was recorded in the Fall of 2004 while the band was on tour in the UK, for broadcast on BBC Radio 1's John Peel program. Hot Snakes would be one of the last groups to record such a session, as Peel died shortly afterwards. It is also the only Hot Snakes release not to feature artwork created by singer/guitarist Rick Froberg.

The EP includes two songs from the band's first album Automatic Midnight and two from their third and final studio album Audit in Progress, all performed live in a studio setting. It was released in both CD and 7" vinyl formats in the US and UK. A single for the album version of the song "Braintrust" had been planned for release in the UK market, and also would have included the unreleased song "DNR," but because "Braintrust" was included on the EP the proposed single was cancelled.

Track listing 
All songs written by Hot Snakes
"Automatic Midnight"
"No Hands"
"Braintrust"
"This Mystic Decade"

Performers 
Rick Froberg - guitar, lead vocals
John Reis - guitar, backing vocals
Gar Wood - bass
Mario Rubalcaba - drums

Album information 
Record label: Swami Records
Recorded and mixed Fall 2004 at Maida Vale Studios for BBC Radio 1's John Peel program (first transmission date: November 18, 2004)
Produced by Mike Walter
Engineered by Jamie Hart
Mastered by Dave Gardner at Magneto Mastering
Released by arrangement with BBC Music
All songs written by Hot Snakes and copyright Hiss N' Piss/BMI

References 

Hot Snakes albums
Peel Sessions recordings
2005 EPs
Live EPs
2005 live albums
Swami Records live albums
Swami Records EPs